Suzanne's Career is a 1963 French comedy-drama film written and directed by Éric Rohmer. It is the second instalment in Rohmer's "Six Moral Tales" series. A flirty Guillaume seduces a woman named Suzanne, which becomes problematic for his friendship with the shy Bertrand, especially when Guillaume's and Suzanne's relationship becomes strained.

Plot
The film takes place in a time of turmoil in France, due to the Cold War and the Algerian War. Two students in Paris, Bertrand (the first person narrator telling us this story from some point in the future), timid, young, and in pharmacy school and the brash Guillaume, who is something of a womanizer, encounter the independent and articulate Suzanne at a café. She has a full-time job and is quite independent, living alone and doing whatever she pleases. Guillaume uses his wit and charm to flirt with and seduce her. She quickly succumbs to Guillaume's coarse advances. After bedding her, he becomes bored, but continues to lead her on despite complaining about her and flirting with other women.

Bertrand believes that Suzanne must lack self-respect in order to let herself be treated so poorly, but remains silent and continues to abet Guillaume's antics. In an effort to regain Guillaume's attention, Suzanne cultivates an interest in Bertrand, spending what little money she has on him. Bertrand ends up despising her even more after he and Guillaume ruin Suzanne financially. Throughout, Bertrand has a crush on her more conventionally pretty Irish friend, Sophie, who vigorously defends Suzanne from Bertrand's criticism. After a party, Suzanne has no money to get home so Bertrand reluctantly says she can sleep in the chair in his room. He means this literally, taking the bed himself as he has an exam in the morning. The next day, he returns to his room to escort Suzanne out only to find money missing from his room. Bertrand blames Suzanne, even though both Suzanne and Guillaume had a chance to take the money, but Sophie thinks it more likely he was robbed earlier by Guillaume.

A year later, when Bertrand is swimming with Sophie, they meet Suzanne with her new fiancé, who is handsome, well-off and charming. The couple are happy together (while Bertrand informs us his relationship with Sophie was in the process of ending) and Bertrand admits he had misjudged Suzanne and that, whether purposely or not, she won because she took away any right he had to pity her and in the end, that is the best revenge.

Cast
 Catherine Sée as Suzanne Hocquetot
 Christian Charrière as Guillaume Peuch-Drumond
 Philippe Beuzen as Bertrand, the narrator
 Diane Wilkinson as Sophie
 Jean-Claude Biette as Jean-Louis
 Patrick Bauchau as Frank
 Pierre Cottrell as art lover/party guest
 Jean-Louis Comolli as party guest

References

External links
 
 
 
 Eric Rohmer: Blueprints for a Brilliant Oeuvre – an essay by Ginette Vincendeau at The Criterion Collection

1963 films
1963 comedy-drama films
1960s French-language films
Films directed by Éric Rohmer
Films produced by Barbet Schroeder
French comedy-drama films
1960s French films